Michael Scott Moore (born 1969) is an American journalist and novelist. He is the author of Sweetness and Blood (2010), about the history of surfing, and The Desert and the Sea (2018), a memoir about his captivity in Somalia.

Moore graduated from University of California, San Diego in 1991 with a degree in German Literature. He lives in Berlin and also holds German citizenship. In January 2012, he was abducted in Galkayo, Somalia while researching a book about piracy. Moore was held captive for over two and a half years, and released September 22, 2014. He is a member of the Board of Directors of Hostage US, a non-profit that supports American hostages and their families.

Abduction

Moore traveled to Somalia on a grant from the Pulitzer Center for Crisis Reporting to research a book on piracy. He was abducted by a local gang of pirates in January 2012 in the town of Galkayo. Several days later, two aid workers, Jessica Buchanan and Poul Thisted, also being held by Somali pirates, were rescued by a Navy SEAL operation. The gang holding Moore subsequently demanded $20 million.

American officials and the German Foreign Ministry collaborated on negotiations with the pirates, until Moore was freed September 22, 2014. It took 977 days for Moore to be released by the pirates after 1.6 million dollars was paid.

Career
Moore has published three books, including the novel Too Much of Nothing, published by Carroll & Graf, and the nonfiction history of surfing Sweetness and Blood: How Surfing Spread from Hawaii and California to the Rest of the World, with Some Unexpected Results, published by Rodale in 2010. Sweetness and Blood was named a Best Book of 2010 by The Economist and PopMatters. The Desert and the Sea became a Nielsen besteller in August 2018, shortly after its publication on July 24, 2018.

Moore worked as the theater columnist for SF Weekly, until he moved to Berlin, Germany in 2005. In Germany he worked as both a staff and a freelance editor for Spiegel Online International. In 2010-11 he covered a trial of ten Somali pirates in Hamburg who were charged with trying to hijack the MV Taipan.

His journalism has been published in The Atlantic Monthly, The New Republic, and the Los Angeles Times. From 2009 to 2012, he also wrote a weekly column for Miller-McCune (now Pacific Standard) on trans-Atlantic issues, including the NATO effort against Somali pirates. In 2009, for the column, he sailed on the Turkish frigate Gediz which had been charged with catching pirates in the Gulf of Aden.

Works

 Too Much of Nothing New York : Carroll & Graf Publishers, 2003. , 
 Sweetness and Blood: How Surfing Spread from Hawaii and California to the Rest of the World, with Some Unexpected Results. New York, NY : Rodale, 2010. , 
 The Desert and the Sea : 977 Days Captive on the Somali Pirate Coast, New York, NY : Harper Wave, 2018. ,

References

University of California, San Diego alumni
Journalists from California
People from Los Angeles
American expatriates in Germany
Hostages
1969 births
Living people